City Walk (aka City Walk Dubai) is an urban precinct in the Al Wasl Community of Dubai, United Arab Emirates, providing a partially pedestrianised shopping and leisure neighbourhood.

Meraas is a major developer in the City Walk area. City Walk covers over 900,000 square meters of land, developed in two phases including commercial and residential areas, providing a destination for tourists. Attractions in the area include The Green Planet bio-dome and the Coca-Cola Arena. it is close to Al Safa Road, Al Wasl Road, and Sheikh Zayed Road.

References

External links

 City Walk website
 City Walk Dubai on YouTube

Geography of Dubai
Tourist attractions in Dubai
Jumeirah, Dubai
Shopping malls in Dubai

UAE is located in the Middle East, South America